The Alco S-5 (DL 421A) was a diesel-electric locomotive of the switcher type rated at , that rode on two-axle trucks, having a B-B wheel arrangement.

This was Alco's second attempt to build a replacement 251-engined switcher to replace the 539-engined S-3 and S-4. Only seven were sold. The demonstrator unit was ALCO specification DL421 and the six production units were ALCO specification DL421A.

Original Owners

See also 
 List of ALCO diesel locomotives
 List of MLW diesel locomotives

External links

 Sarberenyi, Robert. Alco S5, S6, and SSB9 Original Owners.

B-B locomotives
S5
Diesel-electric locomotives of the United States
Railway locomotives introduced in 1954
Standard gauge locomotives of the United States